Charles Jules Edmée Brongniart (11 February 1859, in Paris – 18 April 1899, in Paris) was a French entomologist and paleontologist.

A pioneer in the field of paleoentomology, he made important contributions towards the understanding of insect evolution. He is remembered for his studies of Late Carboniferous fauna found at Commentry, France.

Selected works 
 Les Hyménoptères fossiles, 1881 – Hymenoptera fossils.
 Sur un gigantesque Neurorthoptère, provenant des terrains houillers de Commentry (Allier), 1884 – On a gigantic Neurorthoptera, found in the coalfields of Commentry.
 Les Insectes fossiles des terrains primaires : coup d'oeil rapide sur la faune entomologique des terrains paléozoïques, avec 5 planches en héliogravure, 1885; Translated into English by Mark Stirrup (Salford: J. Roberts and Sons, 1885) as "The fossil insects of the primary group of rocks: a rapid survey of the entomological fauna of the Paleozoic systems". 
 Tableaux de zoologie (classification) (Hermann, Paris, 1886, réédité en 1887, 1888).
 With Henri Fayol (1841–1925), Études sur le terrain houiller de Commentry (Saint-Étienne, 1887–1888).
 Histoire naturelle populaire. L'homme et les animaux (E. Flammarion, Paris, 1892).
 Recherches pour servir á l'histoire des insectes fossiles des temps primaires : procédées d'une étude sur la nervation des ailes des insectes, 1893 – Research in regards to the history of paleoentomology, etc. (preceded by a study on the venation of insect wings).
 Guide du naturaliste voyageur, enseignement spécial pour les voyageurs. Insectes, myriapodes, arachnides, crustacés (Fils de E. Deyrolle, Paris, 1894).
 With Eugène Louis Bouvier (1856–1944), Instructions pour la recherche des animaux articulés (Autun, 1896).
 Apercu sur les insectes fossiles en general, 1896 – Overview on fossil insects in general.

Sources and references 
 Jean Gouillard (2004). Histoire des entomologistes français, 1750-1950. Édition entièrement revue et augmentée. Boubée (Paris) : 287 p.
 Philippe Jaussaud & Édouard R. Brygoo (2004). Du Jardin au Muséum en 516 biographies. Muséum national d’histoire naturelle de Paris : 630 p.

French entomologists
French paleontologists
1859 births
1899 deaths
Burials at Père Lachaise Cemetery
Scientists from Paris
Members of the Ligue de la patrie française